That Is Why You're Overweight is an album by American jazz saxophonist Eddie Harris recorded in 1976 and released on the Atlantic label.

Reception

The Allmusic review stated: "Some of this stuff hits, some of it misses... all of it suggests that Harris' curiosity and impatience had him flailing around in search of a direction".

Track listing
All compositions by Eddie Harris except as indicated
 "It's All Right Now" - 3:56 
 "Why Do You Hurt Me" (Harris, Bradley Bobo) - 4:19 
 "Flowers" - 4:59 
 "That Is Why You're Overweight" (Harris, Sara Harris, Yvonne Harris) - 7:25 
 "Tryin' Ain't Dyin'" - 7:30 
 "Live Again" (Ronald Muldrow) - 4:18 
 "Ooh" - 2:49 
 "Exempt" - 7:37

Personnel
Eddie Harris - tenor saxophone, electric piano, vocals
Ronald Muldrow - guitar, guitorgan vocals
Bradley Bobo - bass, 6 string bass, vocals
Paul Humphrey, Terry Thompson - drums 
Buck Clarke - bongos, percussion, tambourine
Calvin Barnes - drums, percussion, vocals
Marshall Thompson - percussion (track 5)
Bob Ramey - rhythm synthesizer (track 1)
Muhal Richard Abrams (track 5), Bobby Lyle (track 2) - electric piano
Odell Brown - organ (track 5)
Lou Gonzales, Joe Romano - trumpet, flugelhorn (tracks 2, 4 & 8)
Burgess Gardner, Frank Gordon - trumpet (track 5)  
Steve Galloway (track 5), Al Hall Jr. (tracks 2, 4 & 8), Maurice Spears (tracks 2, 4 & 8) - trombone
Delbert Hill - baritone saxophone, oboe, bassoon, tenor saxophone (tracks 2, 4 & 8) 
Willie Henderson - baritone saxophone (track 5)
Edmund Lee Bauer, Sol Bobrov, E. Zlatoff Mirsky - violin (track 5)
Bruce K. Hayden, Harold H. Kupper - viola (track 5)
Karl B. Fruh - cello (track 5) 
Vivian Harrell, Marilyn Haywood, Mary Ann Stewart, Stephana Loeb, Karen Patterson, Nancy Shanks - vocals
Gerald Lee - arranger

References 

Eddie Harris albums
1977 albums
Atlantic Records albums